John Deane Spence (7 December 1920 – 4 March 1986) was a British Conservative Party politician.

Spence was educated at Queen's University, Belfast and worked as a building and civil engineering contractor, merchant banker and farmer.

Spence contested Wakefield in 1964, and Sheffield Heeley in 1966. He was Member of Parliament for Sheffield Heeley from 1970 to 1974, Thirsk and Malton from 1974 to 1983, and Ryedale from 1983 until he died in office in 1986 aged 65.  He was a member of the Speaker's panel of chairmen.

References
The Times Guide to the House of Commons, Times Newspapers Ltd, 1966 & 1983

External links 
 

1920 births
1986 deaths
Conservative Party (UK) MPs for English constituencies
UK MPs 1970–1974
UK MPs 1974
UK MPs 1974–1979
UK MPs 1979–1983
UK MPs 1983–1987